USS S-13 (SS-118) was a second-group (S-3 or "Government") S-class submarine of the United States Navy.

Consyruction and commissioning
S-13′s keel was laid down on 14 February 1920 by the Portsmouth Navy Yard in Kittery, Maine. She was launched on 20 October 1921, sponsored by Miss Mary Howe, and commissioned on 14 July 1923 with Lieutenant Wilder D. Baker in command.

Service history

1923–1936
Following duty along the coast of the Northeastern United States in 1923, S-13 visited the Panama Canal Zone, Saint Thomas in the United States Virgin Islands, and Trinidad from January to April 1924. Departing New London, Connecticut, on 24 November 1924, she proceeded, via the Panama Canal and California, to Hawaii, which she visitied from 27 April to 25 May 1925. She returned to New London on 12 July 1925.

In addition to service in the northeastern United States from then through 1928, S-13 operated in the Panama Canal area from February through April 1926; visited Kingston, Jamaica, from 20 to 28 March 1927, and served again in the Panama Canal area from February to April 1928. From 1929 to 1936, she operated almost exclusively in the Panama Canal area, although she visited Baltimore, Maryland, from 15 May to 5 June 1933, and New London from 15 May to 1 June 1935. Departing Coco Solo in the Panama Canal Zone on 13 June 1936, she was decommissioned on 30 September 1936 at Philadelphia, Pennsylvania.

1940–1945
S-13 was recommissioned on 28 October 1940. Following voyages to Bermuda, S-13 operated in the Panama Canal area from December 1941 (during which the United States entered World war II with the Japanese attack on Pearl Harbor on 7 December) to June 1942; off Guantanamo Bay, Cuba, from June to August 1942; and in the Panama Canal area beginning in August 1942. She then exchanged recognition signals with the bomber, which departed without further incident. She suffered no casualties or damage.

S-13 operated in the Panama Canal area until January 1944, then at Trinidad from February 1944 to May 1944. at Guantanamo Bay from May through July 1944. and in the Panama Canal area through the remainder of 1944. Departing Coco Solo on 3 January 1945, S-13 proceeded to Philadelphia for inactivation.

Decommissioning and disposal
S-13 was decommissioned on 10 April 1945, struck from the Naval Vessel Register on 19 May 1945. and sold on 28 October 1945 to Rosoff Brothers of New York City for scrap. Resold to Northern Metals Company of Philadelphia, she subsequently was scrapped.

In media
The 1930 John Ford film Men Without Women is set aboard a fictional U.S. Navy submarine named USS S-13.

References

Citations

Bibliography 
 Hinman, Charles R., and Douglas E. Campbell. The Submarine Has No Friends: Friendly Fire Incidents Involving U.S. Submarines During World War II. Syneca Research Group, Inc., 2019. .

Ships built in Kittery, Maine
S-13
World War II submarines of the United States
1921 ships
Maritime incidents in August 1942
Friendly fire incidents of World War II